No. 612 Squadron RAF was originally formed in 1937 as an Army Co-operation unit, and flew during the Second World War in the General Reconnaissance role. After the war the squadron was reformed and flew in the Day Fighter role until disbanded in 1957. At present the squadron has a non-flying role as a RAF Medical Reserves unit.

History

Formation and early years

No. 612 Squadron RAF was formed on 1 June 1937 at RAF Dyce as an army co-operation unit of the Auxiliary Air Force and was initially equipped with two-seat Avro Tutor training aircraft. In December 1937 it had received two-seat Hawker Hector Army co-operation aircraft, which were retained when the squadron converted from the Army Co-operation to the General Reconnaissance role. In July 1939 the squadron received Avro Ansons which had room for four crew members and had a much better range, making them better suited for the reconnaissance role.

Second World War: on Whitleys and Wellingtons
No. 612 squadron entered the Second World War as a maritime reconnaissance ("General Reconnaissance") unit within RAF Coastal Command, flying with the Avro Ansons. These were replaced from November 1940 with Armstrong Whitworth Whitleys, and from November 1942 on these made again gradually (April 1943 saw the last Whitley leave the squadron) way for various marks of specially adapted General Reconnaissance (GR) versions of the Vickers Wellington, which the squadron continued to fly until the end of the war. The squadron disbanded on 9 July 1945 at RAF Langham.

Post-war: on Spitfires and Vampires
No. 612 squadron was reformed on 10 May 1946 at RAF Dyce as a fighter squadron of the Royal Auxiliary Air Force. Initially the squadron was equipped with Griffon-engined Spitfire F.14s and in November 1948 it got additional Merlin-engined Spitfire LF.16e fighters. It converted to de Havilland Vampire FB.5s in June 1951, flying these first from RAF Leuchars and later from RAF Edzell and, when the runway was extended, again from RAF Dyce until disbandment on 10 March 1957, on the same day as all other flying units of the RAuxAF.

Present: field surgical support
The squadron was reformed in 1997 at RAF Leuchars from The Air Transportable Surgical Squadron, and maintained that units role of field surgical support. In 2001 the squadron had its first operational role in support of Operation Saif Sareea II, an exercise in Oman. Over a hundred military personnel were treated, mainly for heat-related injuries. In 2003 the squadron was first mobilised for support in a combat zone, in support of Operation TELIC. Squadron members were deployed to Kuwait and Cyprus and finally worked at field hospitals in Basra and Al Ahmara in Iraq. In 2006 No. 612 squadron was again mobilised to support operations in Iraq and was deployed to the field hospital at Shaibah Logistic Base (SLB). Thereafter, the Sqn continued to deploy dedicated medical specialists to augment the Military Hospital and the MERT at Camp Bastion in Afghanistan, earning admiration and commendations for their work. The Sqn continues to train and deploy as required and has now built up an outstanding relationship during 2017-2018 with a USAF Reserve Medical Sqn, which allows for multi-national training. No 612 Sqn goes from strength to strength !

Commanding Officers since reformation of No 612 (County of Aberdeen) Sqn at RAF Leuchars (now Leuchars Station) in 1997

Aircraft operated

Squadron bases

Commanding officers-1937-1957

References

Notes

Bibliography

External links

 Squadron histories for nos. 611–620 sqn on RAFWebs Air of Authority – A History of RAF Organisation
 Princess Mary's Royal Air Force Nursing Service
 RAF Leuchars No 612 (County of Aberdeen) Squadron

Aircraft squadrons of the Royal Air Force in World War II
612
Military units and formations established in 1937
1937 establishments in Scotland
Scotland in World War II